The Mini Zoo is located on Grand Trunk Road near Pipli bus stand in Kurukshetra, Haryana, India.

Description
Spread over 27 acres of land along the National Highway-1 in Kurukshetra, Pipli zoo is one of the three maintained zoos of the state wildlife department. The other two are in Rohtak and Bhiwani. The zoo has the following animals:

 Asiatic lion
 Blackbuck
 Hanuman langur
 Chital (spotted deer)
 Indian leopard
 Hyena
 Jackal
 Peafowl
 Red jungle fowl
 Hippo
 Gharial
 Mugger
 Sambar

Incidents related to zoos in Haryana
 Deer Park, Hisar, founded in 1970-71, is oldest among zoos and deer parks in Haryana
 Haryana is now left with 5 tigers in captivity: 2 each in Mini Zoo, Bhiwani and Rohtak Zoo and 1 in Pipali Zoo
 In 2003, a baby baboon was born in Pipali Zoo
 In 2009, tiger Apaya of Bhiwani zoo attacked and killed another tigress.
 In 2011, tiger Apaya of Bhiwani zoo entered the enclosure of another tigress Rani and attacked her. Rani died and was buried on the zoo premises.
 In 2011 another tiger Brondis had killed a caretaker in Bhiwani zoo.
 In 2014, 43 private school kids who were visiting Bhiwnai zoo were attacked by the bees.

Riverfont

Pipli Sarasvati Riverfont  is being developed are a riverfront. In 2021, Haryana Sarasvati Heritage Development Board initiated projects to develop 5 river fronts under the under Sarasvatio Revival Project on the rejuvenated Sarasvati river at Pipli, Pehowa, Bilaspur, Dosarka (on Panchkula-Yamunanagar NH-344 near Sirsgarh) and the Theh Polar (near Sarasvati-Sindhu Civilisation archaeological site on Kaithal-Guhla SH-11). Pipli riverfront will be on the pattern Sabarmati Riverfront.

It is one of the important tirtha in the 48 kos parikrama of Kurukshetra.

Gallery

Representative album of types of animals and birds found in this zoo.

See also
 48 kos parikrama of Kurukshetra
 Gita Mahotsav
 Lohgarh (Bilaspur)
 List of protected areas of Haryana
 Parikrama
 Sadaura

References

External links
 A video of a Bengal tiger in Pipli Zoo is here.

Wildlife sanctuaries in Haryana
Zoos in Haryana
1970 establishments in Haryana
Animal breeding organisations in India